John White Chadwick (October 19, 1840 – December 11, 1904) was an American writer and clergyman of the Unitarian Church.

Biography
He was born in Marblehead, Massachusetts. He was apprenticed to a shoemaker early in life, but decided to further his academic learning, and entered the Massachusetts normal school at Bridgewater in 1857. He decided to become a minister, and graduated in 1864 from Harvard Divinity School. That year he also became pastor of the Second Unitarian Church in Brooklyn, New York. His sermons attracted attention, and he became known as a radical teacher of the doctrines of his church. He was elected Phi Beta Kappa poet at Harvard in 1885, and in the following year preached the alumni sermon at the Divinity School. He remained at the Second Unitarian Church until his death in Brooklyn on December 11, 1904.

Writing
He published many of his discourses, which for some time were issued serially, and was a frequent contributor to the Unitarian journals. His publications in book form are:
 Life of N. A. Staples (Boston, 1870)
 A Book of Poems (1875)
 The Bible of To-day (New York, 1878)
 The Faith of Reason (Boston, 1879)
 Some Aspects of Religion (New York, 1879)
 The Man Jesus (Boston, 1881)
 Belief and Life (New York, 1881)
 Origin and Destiny (Boston, 1883)
 In Nazareth Town: A Christmas Fantasy (1884)
 A Daring Faith (1885)
 Evolution and Social Reform (1890)
 Old and New Unitarian Belief (1894)
 The Power of an Endless Life
 The Revolution of God
 Theodore Parker, Preacher and Reformer (1900)
 George William Curtis
 Later Poems (1905)

Notes

References

External links

 

American religious writers
American theologians
American Christian clergy
American Unitarians
Harvard Divinity School alumni
People from Marblehead, Massachusetts
American male poets
1840 births
1904 deaths
19th-century American poets
19th-century male writers
American male non-fiction writers
19th-century American clergy